Manchi Vallaki Manchivadu is a 1973 Telugu Eastmancolor action film, directed by K. S. R. Das and produced by S. Bhavanarayana. The film had musical score by Satyam. The action scenes were shot in the villages of Rajasthan.

Plot

Cast

Soundtrack 
The Soundtrack of the film was composed by Satyam and penned by Daasarathi, C. Narayana Reddy, Aarudhra and Sri Sri.

References 

1973 films
1970s Telugu-language films
Indian action films
1973 action films